François Rozenthal (born 20 June 1975) is a French former professional ice hockey player.

Personal
Rozenthal is Jewish, and is the identical twin brother of Maurice Rozenthal, who is also a French ice hockey player.

Ice hockey career
He has been affiliated with Gothiques d'Amiens, in Amiens, France, and  IF Björklöven, in Umeå, Sweden.

Rozenthal participated for France in ice hockey, playing on the France men's national ice hockey team, in both the 1998 Winter Olympics in Nagano, and the 2002 Winter Olympics in Salt Lake City.

In 2006, he represented France against Great Britain in the World Championship, Division One.

Awards
1995–9: 	French League Best Young Player "Jean-Pierre Graff Trophy"
2003–04: 	French League Most Points "Charles Ramsey Trophy" (40)
2004–09: 	French All-Star Team

See also
List of select Jewish ice hockey players

Career statistics

Regular season and playoffs

FRA totals do not include stats from the 2000–01 season.

International

References

External links

Eurohockey bio

1975 births
Living people
IF Björklöven players
Corsaires de Dunkerque players
French ice hockey right wingers
20th-century French Jews
Gothiques d'Amiens players
Hockey Club de Reims players
HC Morzine-Avoriaz players
Ice hockey players at the 1998 Winter Olympics
Ice hockey players at the 2002 Winter Olympics
Identical twins
Jewish ice hockey players
LHC Les Lions players
Olympic ice hockey players of France
Sportspeople from Dunkirk
French twins
Twin sportspeople